Pt. Shounak Abhisheki is an Indian vocalist, composer of classical, semi-classical, and devotional music.

Profile
Shounak Abhisheki, the son and disciple of Maestro Pt. Jitendra Abhisheki, is a vocalist who combines Agra and Jaipur styles of Hindustani Classical Music. Abhisheki trained under Smt. Kamaltai Tambe of the Jaipur Gharana.

Career

Shounak has performed special programs such as Swarabhishek, Tulsi Ke Ram & Kabir and Abhang, based on his father's compositions.

In addition to several Indian music festivals, he has performed a series of concerts in the United States, the United Kingdom, the Soviet Union, the Persian Gulf and Thailand.

Shounak has been recorded by Sony Music, Music Today, Times Music, Ninad Music, Music Curry, and Fountain Music.

Awards and recognitions 

Pune Ki Asha Puraskar
Balgandharva Puraskar
Zee Gaurav Puraskar
N.C.P.A. Excellence Award
Pt. Dinanath Mangeshkar Puraskar by Marathi Natyaparishad
Saraswatibai Rane Puraskar
Symbiosis University Cultural Award

References

External links 
Artists website

Hindustani singers
Living people
People from North Goa district
Singers from Goa
21st-century Indian male classical singers
Year of birth missing (living people)